Fussels Corner is a census-designated place (CDP) in Polk County, Florida, United States. The population was 5,313 at time of the 2000 census. It is part of the Lakeland–Winter Haven Metropolitan Statistical Area.

Geography

Fussels Corner is located at  (28.061905, -81.853604).

Demographics

As of the 2000 census, there were 5,313 people, 2,236 households, and 1,647 families residing in the CDP. The racial makeup of the CDP was 88.71% White, 5.44% African American, 0.36% Native American, 0.15% Asian, 0.04% Pacific Islander, 3.86% from other races, and 1.45% from two or more races. Hispanic or Latino of any race were 5.74% of the population.

There were 2,236 households, out of which 21.0% had children under the age of 18 living with them, 59.7% were married couples living together, 9.6% had a female householder with no husband present, and 26.3% were non-families. 20.8% of all households were made up of individuals, and 9.6% had someone living alone who was 65 years of age or older.  The average household size was 2.38 and the average family size was 2.68.

In the CDP, the population was spread out, with 19.7% under the age of 18, 6.2% from 18 to 24, 21.8% from 25 to 44, 27.4% from 45 to 64, and 24.9% who were 65 years of age or older.  The median age was 47 years. For every 100 females, there were 100.1 males.  For every 100 females age 18 and over, there were 98.0 males.

The median income for a household in the CDP was $34,395, and the median income for a family was $41,263. Males had a median income of $26,145 versus $20,293 for females. The per capita income for the CDP was $17,998.  About 8.6% of families and 13.7% of the population were below the poverty line, including 26.4% of those under age 18 and 4.5% of those age 65 or over.

References

Census-designated places in Polk County, Florida
Census-designated places in Florida